Don Kuiken is professor emeritus in the Department of Psychology at the University of Alberta, Edmonton. He received his Ph.D. in psychology in 1970 from the University of Texas at Austin. His research program is a phenomenologically guided blend of two areas: dreaming and literary reading.
He has served as the editor of the journal Dreaming and is member of the International Association for the Study of Dreams. Currently he is Associate Editor of the journal Scientific Study of Literature. He is president of the International Society for the Empirical Study of Literature, and has published extensively over his main areas of research: research on dreaming, research on reader response, and phenomenological methods.

References

External links 
 University website
 Personal website
 International Society for the Empirical Study of Literature

Canadian cognitive scientists
Phenomenologists
21st-century American psychologists
Canadian psychologists
Living people
University of Texas at Austin alumni
Academic staff of the University of Alberta
Year of birth missing (living people)